The Llewellyn-class minesweepers were a series of ten coastal minesweepers constructed for the Royal Canadian Navy during the Second World War. Based on the Admiralty type , the Llewellyn class were constructed of wood and used for the removal of magnetic influence mines. Two were built in Quebec, with the eight constructed on the Western Coast of Canada. Mostly used as guard ships during the war, only three of the ten remained in Royal Canadian Navy service following the war, with the last  being discarded in 1957. Following naval service, vessels of the class ended up in commercial service, with some becoming fishing vessels, cargo ships and one a floating restaurant. Six of the ten ships were lost in commercial service.

Description
Based on the Admiralty type s, the Llewellyn class were built with wooden hulls for deployment against magnetic influence mines that would detect a steel hull passing nearby and detonate.

The Llewellyn class were armed with four  machine guns placed in two twin mounts. At some point, their armament was changed to one 0.5-inch machine gun placed amidships and twin  machine guns on the bridge wings. The minesweepers were equipped with the "Double L" magnetic minesweeping gear and had a complement of 23 composed of 3 officers and 20 crew.

Ships in class

Service history
The first two vessels of the class were constructed at Île d'Orléans, Quebec. Llewellyn and Lloyd George were both commissioned on 24 August 1942 at Quebec City and escorted a convoy from Quebec City to Sydney, Nova Scotia before arriving at Halifax, Nova Scotia. Both vessels' names begin with a double "l", a reflection of their minesweeping gear. They would be the only two vessels that began their names as such, as the eight minesweepers constructed in British Columbia did not follow this pattern.

During the Second World War, Llewellyn and Lloyd George operated out of Halifax performing sweeps of the approaches to Halifax Harbour. Following the war, Llewellyn became the guard ship for the Royal Canadian Navy reserve fleet at Halifax. Taken out of service on 14 June 1946. Llewellyn was recommissioned on 25 July 1949 as tender at Saint John, New Brunswick associated with the naval reserve division , primarily used for training. That summer, the ship made a tour of Newfoundland, after it became the 10th province of Canada. The ship was decommissioned again on 31 October 1951. Sold 1957 for commercial use. Renamed Llewellyn II, the fishing vessel foundered off Cape Breton Island on 28 October 1960. Following war, Lloyd George was used as a bathythermograph survey vessel until 16 July 1948 when the ship was decommissioned. Lloyd George was sold on 14 May 1951 to become a floating restaurant at Bridgewater, Nova Scotia. The hulk was abandoned ten years later.

The British Columbia-built minesweepers all joined the fleet in 1944 and patrolled between Esquimalt and Prince Rupert, British Columbia, joining either escort force until the end of 1945. All eight were decommissioned and seven were sold to commercial interests. The vast majority of them had eventful fates. Daerwood was sold for commercial use on 30 December 1946. The vessel caught fire and sank at Bridgetown, Barbados on 13 October 1973. Cranbrook was purchased by a Nanaimo towing firm in November 1947. In 1950 the vessel's registry disappeared from Lloyd's Registry. Coquitlam was sold in October 1946 and renamed Wilcox. The ship went aground on 17 June 1954 on Anticosti Island and written off. Kalamalka was sold in 1946 for conversion to a fishing vessel. The ship burned and sank while fishing in Wallis Bay, British Columbia on 18 March 1968. Lavallee was sold on 13 November 1947 to become fishing vessel of the same name. The ship burned and sank near Burgeo, Newfoundland and Labrador on 1 March 1967. Rossland was sold to Vancouver towing company in 1946 and renamed La Verne. In 1971, the vessel was resold to a US buyer. St. Joseph was sold for commercial use and was a Mexican-flagged cargo vessel until the ship's registry was deleted in 1988.

Revelstoke was the only British Columbia-built vessel to be kept following the war. Revelstoke sailed to Halifax and served as tender to HMCS Stadacona and  before being decommissioned for the final time on 23 October 1953. The vessel was sold in 1957 and renamed Shirley Ann in 1959. Shirley Ann caught fire and sank off Newfoundland on 12 October 1979.

Citations

Sources
 
 
 

World War II minesweepers of Canada